Nannoperca oxleyana, commonly known as the Oxleyan pygmy perch, is a species of temperate perch endemic to Australia.  It occurs in the coastal drainages of eastern Australia, being found in dune lakes, ponds, creeks, and swamps with plentiful vegetation to provide shelter.  The waters in which it lives are often dark and acidic.  It preys upon aquatic insects and their larvae, as well as planktonic crustaceans and even algae.  This species can reach  SL, though most do not exceed .  It can also be found in the aquarium trade.

References

oxleyana
Freshwater fish of Australia
Taxonomy articles created by Polbot
Fish described in 1940